Neobarrettia is a genus of spiny predatory katydids in the family Tettigoniidae.

Species
There are nine described species in Neobarrettia.

 Neobarrettia bambalio Cohn, 1965
 Neobarrettia cremnobates Cohn, 1965
 Neobarrettia hakippah Cohn, 1965
 Neobarrettia imperfecta (Rehn, 1900)
 Neobarrettia pulchella (Tinkham, 1944)
 Neobarrettia sinaloae (Rehn & Hebard, 1920)
 Neobarrettia spinosa (Caudell, 1907) – greater arid-land katydid
 Neobarrettia vannifera Cohn, 1965
 Neobarrettia victoriae (Caudell, 1907) – lesser arid-land katydid

References

 Capinera J.L, Scott R.D., Walker T.J. (2004). Field Guide to Grasshoppers, Katydids, and Crickets of the United States. Cornell University Press.

 
Tettigoniidae